Miente is a 2009 Puerto Rican drama film directed by Rafi Mercado, and based on the novel "Different", written by Javier Ávila. The film was selected as the Puerto Rican entry for the Best Foreign Language Film at the 83rd Academy Awards but it did not make the final shortlist. The film won the inaugural Havana Star Prize for Best Director in 2010 at the 11th Havana Film Festival New York.

Cast
 Oscar H. Guerrero - Henry
 Maine Anders - Jane
 Yamil Collazo - Samuel
 Teresa Hernández - Marta
 Eyra Aguero Joubert - Mistress Latipa
 Efraín López Neris - Charlie
 Rafel Perez-Veve - Thief
 Frank Perozo - Diff
 Julio Ramos - Garb - Neighbor
 Mariana Santángelo - Paula
 Carlos Vega - Jimenez

See also
 List of submissions to the 83rd Academy Awards for Best Foreign Language Film
 List of Puerto Rican submissions for the Academy Award for Best Foreign Language Film

References

External links

2009 films
Puerto Rican films
2000s Spanish-language films
2009 drama films